Matthew Rutherford may refer to:

Matt Rutherford, character in Glee
Matthew Rutherford, High Sheriff of Londonderry City
Matthew S. Rutherford of Office of Financial Markets (U.S.)
Matthew Rutherford (actor) in The Silent Fall